The  is a botanical garden with alligators located in the Fuji-Hakone-Izu National Park at 971-9 Naramoto, Higashiizu-cho, Kamo, Shizuoka Prefecture, Japan. It is open daily. An admission fee is charged.

The garden opened in 1958. According to Kawata, in 2004 it contained 29 reptile species (349 specimens) in its zoo. The garden also contains a tropical botanical garden and fruit garden heated by hot spring water, with a lotus greenhouse (giant lotus, etc.), main greenhouse (hibiscus, orchid, etc.) and annex greenhouse (banana, papaya, pineapple, etc.). Other plants include bougainvillea.

See also 
 List of botanical gardens in Japan

References 
 Atagawa Tropical & Alligator Garden (Japanese)
 Shizuoka Guide entry
 A List of Plants in Atagawa Tropical Garden & Alligator Farm 1972, paperback, 1972.
 Ken Kawata, "Reptiles in Japanese Collections, Part 2: Squamates and Crocodilians, 1999", International Zoo News, vol. 51/2, no. 331, March 2004.  .

Botanical gardens in Japan
Zoos in Japan
Gardens in Shizuoka Prefecture
Museums in Shizuoka Prefecture
Fuji-Hakone-Izu National Park
Zoos established in 1958
1958 establishments in Japan
Higashiizu, Shizuoka